Dávid Oláh (born 17 September 1988 in Nyíregyháza) is a Hungarian football player who currently plays for Várda SE.

References
Profile at HLSZ.
Profile at MLSZ.

1988 births
Living people
People from Nyíregyháza
Hungarian footballers
Association football midfielders
Nyíregyháza Spartacus FC players
Hajdúböszörményi TE footballers
Kisvárda FC players
Nemzeti Bajnokság I players
Sportspeople from Szabolcs-Szatmár-Bereg County